Dendrotriton rabbi , commonly known as the Guatemalan bromeliad salamander, is a species of salamander in the family Plethodontidae. It is endemic to Guatemala and is known from the Montañas de Cuilco, near the Mexican border, and from the Sierra de los Cuchumatanes. Its range might extend into Mexico.

Etymology
The specific name rabbi honours George B. Rabb, an American zoologist.

Description
Individuals larger than about  SVL are mature. Tail is longer than the body in adults. The limbs are slender and relatively long. The feet are slightly webbed. The body is dark brown dorsally and has obscure orange
flecks and lighter pigmentation mid-dorsally; some individuals have light mid-dorsal stripe, paravertebral stripes, or distinct reticulate blotching. The venter is light gray and is diffusely peppered with small melanophores.

Habitat and conservation
Dendrotriton rabbi inhabits forests at the subtropical-temperate forest transition zone. It occurs in bromeliads and under bark on tree stumps and logs. The species is threatened by habitat loss caused by forest clearance, typically for wood extraction and expanding small-holder farming.

References

Dendrotriton
Amphibians described in 1975
Endemic fauna of Guatemala
Amphibians of Guatemala
Taxa named by David B. Wake
Taxonomy articles created by Polbot